Cyrus Lazelle Warner (1789–1852) was an American architect in New York City. He designed the Greek Revival architecture Kahal Kadosh Beth Elohim Synagogue, built in 1840 in Charleston, South Carolina, as well as a church in a similar style two years earlier. He was also involved in the Merchant's Exchange Building (New York) with Isaiah Rogers. He had his office at 122 Broadway from 1842 until 1847.

His sons Samuel A. Warner and Benjamin Warner were both architects in New York City.  His daughter Harriet Amanda Warner married architect Leopold Eidlitz in 1845. Cyrus L. W. Eidlitz, Warner's grandson, was also an architect.

He may have served in the military from Cayuga County.

He was married to Elizabeth Wadland Adams (1792–1860).

References

1789 births
1852 deaths
Architects from New York City